The Sandwich class ships of the line were a class of three 90-gun second rates, designed for the Royal Navy by Sir Thomas Slade.

Ships

Builder: Chatham Dockyard
Ordered: 22 November 1755
Launched: 14 April 1759
Fate: Broken up, 1810

Builder: Chatham Dockyard
Ordered: 22 April 1758
Launched: 21 April 1761
Fate: Sold out of the service, 1793

Builder: Woolwich Dockyard
Ordered: 12 November 1755
Launched: 5 July 1761
Fate: Wrecked, 1807

References

Lavery, Brian (2003) The Ship of the Line – Volume 1: The development of the battlefleet 1650–1850. Conway Maritime Press. .
Winfield, Rif (2007) British Warships in the Age of Sail 1714–1792: Design, Construction, Careers and Fates. Seaforth Publishing. .

 
Ship classes of the Royal Navy
Ship of the line classes